Stephan Wilhelm (born July 12, 1983) is a German professional ice hockey defenceman. He is currently playing for the SC Riessersee in the DEL2. He has previously played for the Hannover Scorpions, the Straubing Tigers, and the Schwenninger Wild Wings. On July 5, 2013, Wilhelm signed a one-year contract to transfer from the Scorpions to the Wild Wings.

References

External links

1983 births
Living people
German ice hockey defencemen
Hannover Scorpions players
SC Riessersee players
Schwenninger Wild Wings players
Straubing Tigers players
Sportspeople from Garmisch-Partenkirchen